La Tour-Saint-Gelin is a commune in the Indre-et-Loire département in central France.

It is known for the production of fine wines.

Population

See also
Communes of the Indre-et-Loire department

References

Communes of Indre-et-Loire